The Erlöserkirche (Church of the Redeemer) was a Protestant neo-Gothic church building in Dresden. It was built by from 1878 to 1880 by Gotthilf Ludwig Möckel, wrecked in 1945 by bombing and finally demolished in 1961–62.

References 

Former churches in Dresden